Harold Silverstone (1915 – 1974) was a New Zealand mathematician and statistician.

Early life and education 

He was born on 20 January 1915 in Dunedin, Otago, New Zealand. His father Mark Woolf Silverstone was a Jewish immigrant from Poland. Harold Silverstone was educated at Otago Boys High School. He later attended the University of Otago where he attained a B.A. in 1934 and an M.A. in 1935. He completed his PhD at the University of Edinburgh in 1939.

Academic career  

He was appointed a lecturer at the Department of Mathematics at the Otago University in 1946. He was appointed as the Statistician to the New Zealand National Service Department in 1940.

Contributions to mathematics 

He has made numerous contributions to mathematics, such as independently deriving the Cramér–Rao bound.

Personal life 
He was married twice, once to Madge Silverstone and another time to Eleanor Matilda Silverstone.

He was a lifelong member of the New Zealand Communist Party.

References

External links 
 Applications: Harold Silverstone: A Perspective
 https://www.stats.org.nz/app/uploads/2018/07/A-History-of-Statistics-in-New-Zealand.pdf

1915 births
1974 deaths
20th-century New Zealand mathematicians